, better known by his stage name , is a Japanese actor. He appeared in the weekly prime-time television series Mito Kōmon. The role he is best known for, however, is Gouki/GingaBlue in Seijuu Sentai Gingaman, and  he reprised the role in two Super Sentai Series V-Cinema Films: Gogo V Vs Gingaman and Gaoranger Vs Super Sentai. He also competed on Sasuke during the early 2000s.

Selected filmography 
 Seijuu Sentai Gingaman (1998–1999)
 Seijuu Sentai Gingaman vs Megaranger  (1999)
 Kyuukyuu Sentai GoGo-V vs Gingaman (2000)
 Tales of the Unusual (2000)
 Red Shadow (2001)
 Hyakujuu Sentai Gaoranger vs Super Sentai (2001)
 Yellow Dragon (2003)
 Fune o Oritara Kanojo no Shima aka Getting Off the Boat at Her Island (2003)
 School Wars: Hero (2004)
 Shinsengumi! (2004)
 Sakigake!! Otokojuku  (2008)
 Mr. Osomatsu (2017, voice)

References

External links 
 
 Shōei Official blog

1974 births
Living people
Japanese male actors
Sasuke (TV series) contestants